Isoglossa nervosa is a species of plant in the family Acanthaceae. It is endemic to Cameroon.  Its natural habitat is subtropical or tropical dry forests.

References

Flora of Cameroon
nervosa
Vulnerable plants
Taxonomy articles created by Polbot